The 37th Annual GMA Dove Awards, also called the 37th Annual GMA Music Awards, were held on April 5, 2006 recognizing accomplishments of Christian musicians for the year 2005. The show was held at the Grand Ole Opry House in Nashville, Tennessee, and was hosted by Rebecca St. James and Kirk Franklin. This was the last year in which the awards were called the "GMA Music Awards", since they will change their names to "GMA Dove Awards".

Nominations were announced earlier in 2006 by Kirk Franklin and Rebecca St. James at the Hilton Nashville Downtown in Music City, Tennessee.

Chris Tomlin won four awards, including Artist of the Year, while The Afters were awarded New Artist of the Year. Casting Crowns, David Crowder Band, Kirk Franklin, and The Crabb Family each won two awards.

Performers

Telecast ceremony
The following performed:

Awards

General

Artist of the Year
Casting Crowns
Chris Tomlin
Jeremy Camp
Natalie Grant
Switchfoot

New Artist of the Year
Ernie Haase & Signature Sound
Krystal Meyers
Mat Kearney
Stellar Kart
The Afters

Group of the Year
BarlowGirl
Casting Crowns
David Crowder Band
Kutless
MercyMe 

Male Vocalist of the Year
Chris Tomlin
David Phelps
Jason Crabb
Jeremy Camp
Mark Hall

Female Vocalist of the Year
Amy Grant
Bethany Dillon
Joy Williams
Natalie Grant
Nichole Nordeman

Song of the Year
"Cry Out to Jesus" – Third Day
Mac Powell, Tai Anderson, Brad Avery, David Carr, Mark Lee, songwriters
"Friend of God" – Israel and New Breed
Israel Houghton, Michael Gungor, songwriters
"Held" – Natalie Grant
Christa Wells, songwriter
"Hide" – Joy Williams
Joy Williams, Jason Houser, Matthew West, songwriters
"Holy is the Lord" – Chris Tomlin
Chris Tomlin, Louie Giglio, songwriters
"How Great is Our God" – Chris Tomlin
Chris Tomlin, Jesse Reeves, Ed Cash, songwriters
"Indescribable" – Laura Story
Laura Story, Jesse Reeves, songwriters
"Lifesong" – Casting Crowns
Mark Hall, songwriter
"Only Grace" – Matthew West
Matthew West, Kenny Greenberg, songwriters
"Voice of Truth" – Casting Crowns
Mark Hall, Steven Curtis Chapman, songwriters

Producer of the Year
Ed Cash
Brown Bannister
 Mark A. Miller
Otto Price
Vince Gill

Pop

Pop/Contemporary Recorded Song of the Year
 "Be My Escape" – Relient K
 "Cry Out to Jesus" – Third Day
 "Held" – Natalie Grant
 "Hide" – Joy Williams
 "Lifesong" – Casting Crowns

Pop/Contemporary Album of the Year
 Awaken – Natalie Grant
 Genesis – Joy Williams
 Lifesong – Casting Crowns Redemption Songs – Jars of Clay
 Restored – Jeremy Camp

Rock

Rock Recorded Song of the Year
 "Lay Down My Pride" – Jeremy Camp
 "Let Go" – BarlowGirl
 "The Slam" – TobyMac (featuring T–Bone) "The Wait Is Over" – Disciple
 "Who I Am Hates Who I've Been" – Relient K

Rock Album of the Year
 All Gas. No Brake. – Stellar Kart
 Beauty From Pain – Superchick
 Disciple – Disciple
 Mmhmm – Relient K The Art of Breaking – Thousand Foot Krutch

Rock/Contemporary Recorded Song of the Year
 "Beautiful Love" – The Afters
 "Here is Our King" – David Crowder Band "I Can't Do This" – Plumb
 "Mirror" – BarlowGirl
 "Stars" – Switchfoot

Rock/Contemporary Album of the Year
 A Collision – David Crowder Band Another Journal Entry – BarlowGirl
 I Wish We All Could Win – The Afters
 Nothing is Sound – Switchfoot
 Wherever You Are – Third Day

Rap/Hip-Hop

Rap/Hip Hop Recorded Song of the Year
 "Are You Real?" – KJ-52 (featuring Kutless)
 "Love (So Beautiful)" – DJ Maj (featuring Liquid Beats)
 "Stereo" – 4th Avenue Jones
 "Trainwreck" – Mat Kearney "We Don't Play" – Grits (featuring Manchild)

Rap/Hip Hop Album of the Year
 Behind the Musik (A Boy Named Jonah) – KJ–52 BoogiRoot – DJ Maj
 Dichotomy B – Grits
 Stereo: The Evolution of HipRockSoul – 4th Avenue Jones
 The Boy vs. The Cynic – John Reuben

Inspirational

Inspirational Recorded Song of the Year
 "All My Praise" – Selah
 "Days of Elijah" – Twila Paris
 "Holy Ground" – The Crabb Family
 "In Christ Alone" – Brian Littrell "Lay It Down" – Jaci Velasquez

Inspirational Album of the Year
 Believe – Natalie Grant
 Greatest Hymns – Selah
 Hymned, No. 1 – Bart Millard Life is a Church – David Phelps
 Rock of Ages... Hymns and Faith – Amy GrantGospel

Southern Gospel Recorded Song of the Year
 "Good Morning Lord" – Young Harmony
 "Greater is He" – The Crabb Family
 "Long As I Got King Jesus" – Brian Free & Assurance "Not That You Died" – Legacy Five
 "Through the Fire" – The Crabb Family (featuring the Brooklyn Tabernacle Choir)Southern Gospel Album of the Year
 Bill Gaither – Bill Gaither
 Common Thread – The Oak Ridge Boys
 Ernie Haase & Signature Sound – Ernie Haase & Signature Sound
 Live at Brooklyn Tabernacle – The Crabb Family Live in NYC – Brian Free & Assurance

Traditional Gospel Recorded Song of the Year
 "All Night" – Alvin Darling
 "Been So Good To Me" – The Mighty Clouds of Joy
 "God Blocked It" – Kurt Carr "I Know the Truth (Lies)" – Shirley Caesar (featuring Tonex)
 "We’ve Come to Magnify the Lord" – Rizen
 "Whatever You Want (God’s Got It)" – Chicago Mass Choir

Traditional Gospel Album of the Year
 Atom Bomb – Blind Boys of Alabama I Know the Truth – Shirley Caesar
 I Shall Not Be Moved – Rev. F.C. Barnes
 In the House of the Lord – The Mighty Clouds of Joy
 Live in Memphis, He Said It – Dottie Peoples
 Project Praise: Live in Atlanta – Chicago Mass Choir
 Rizen 2 – Rizen

Contemporary Gospel Recorded Song of the Year
 "Be Blessed" – Yolanda Adams
 "God Is Able" – Smokie Norful
 "I Will Find A Way" – Fred Hammond
 "Not Forgotten" – Israel & New Breed "Presence of the Lord" – Christ Tabernacle Choir

Contemporary Gospel Album of the Year
 Dream – BeBe Winans
 Mary Mary – Mary Mary Now Is The Time – Anointed
 Psalms, Hymns & Spiritual Songs – Donnie McClurkin
 When He Came – Martha Munizzi
 Worshipper – Darwin Hobbs

Country & Bluegrass

Country Recorded Song of the Year
 "Angels" – Randy Travis
 "Jesus, Take the Wheel" – Carrie Underwood "Mawmaw’s Song (In the Sweet By and By)" – Bart Millard
 "They Don’t Understand" – Sawyer Brown
 "When I Get Where I'm Going" – Brad Paisley (featuring Dolly Parton)

Country Album of the Year
 About You – Corey Brooks
 Count It All Joy – Susie Luchsinger
 Glory Train: Songs of Faith, Worship, and Praise – Randy Travis Perfect Love – McRaes
 Souls' Chapel – Marty Stuart & His Fabulous Superlatives

Bluegrass Recorded Song of the Year
 "A Living Prayer" – Alison Krauss & Union Station "Low and Down" – McRaes
 "One Rose" – The Lewis Family
 "There Is Power in the Blood" – Buddy Greene
 "Why Did I Wait So Long?" – Ricky Skaggs & Kentucky Thunder

Bluegrass Album of the Year
 Hymns & Prayer Songs – Buddy Greene
 New Beginnings – DEWgrass
 One Rose – The Lewis Family Shine On – Ralph Stanley
 So Glad – The Bradleys

Praise & Worship

Worship Song of the Year
 "Be Thou My Vision" – Selah
Traditional song
 "Blessed Be Your Name" – Newsboys
Matt Redman, Beth Redman, songwriters
 "Holy Is the Lord" – Chris Tomlin
Chris Tomlin, Louie Giglio, songwriters
 "How Great Is Our God" – Chris TomlinChris Tomlin, Jesse Reeves, Ed Cash, songwriters "Indescribable" – Chris Tomlin
Laura Story, Jesse Reeves, songwriters
 "Strong Tower" – Kutless
Marc Byrd, Mark Lee, Aaron Sprinkle, Jon Micah Sumrall, songwriters

Praise & Worship Album of the Year
 Blessed Be Your Name: The Songs of Matt Redman Vol. 1 – Matt Redman Alive in South Africa – Israel & New Breed
 He Is Exalted (Live Worship) – Twila Paris
 Rescue (Live Worship) – NewSong
 Strong Tower – Kutless

Urban

Urban Recorded Song of the Year
 "A Brighter Day" – George Huff
 "Heaven" – Mary Mary
 "Jesus Will" – Antonio Neal
 "Looking for You" – Kirk Franklin "Pray" – CeCe Winans

Urban Album of the Year
 Charles and Taylor – Charles and Taylor
 Day by Day – Yolanda Adams
 Hero – Kirk Franklin Just Until... – Kierra "Kiki" Sheard
 Miracles – George Huff

Others

Instrumental Album of the Year
 Adonai – Hector David
 Life – Andy Hunter° Songs of Remembrance – Wayne Haun
 The Power of Your Love – Mark McClure
 Tribute to Bill and Gloria Gaither – Anthony Burger

Children's Music Album of the Year
 Absolute Modern Worship for Kids – Various Born to Worship: The Praise Baby Collection – Various
 Cedarmont Worship For Kids Volume 1 – Various
 Here I Am To Worship for Kids 2 – Various
 Jesus Is My Superhero – Hillsong
 King of the Jungle – Celeste Clydesdale

Spanish Language Album of the Year
 Adorar: Cantos de Alabanza y Adoracion – Various
 Brillas: Assiria Do Nascimiento – Miguel Villagran
 Dios es Bueno – Marcos Witt
 En Vivo desde Costa Rica – Funky
 Hip Hop y Reggaetón Constructivo – 7th Poet
 Leonardo – Leonardo Mi Propósito – Julissa

Special Event Album of the Year
 Come Let Us Adore Him (Essential Records)
 Happy Christmas Vol. 4 – (Tooth & Nail Records)
 Music Inspired by The Chronicles of Narnia: The Lion, the Witch and the Wardrobe (Sparrow Records) Passion: How Great is Our God – (sixstepsrecords/Sparrow Records)
 WOW Christmas: Green (Word Records)

Choral Collection of the Year
Bigger Than Life – Michael Neale, Harold Ross, Jay Rouse
Come, Let Us Adore Him – Lari Goss
Great and Marvelous: Celebrating the Songs of Tommy Walker Vol. 2 – Tommy Walker, Bradley Knight
Hymns (Classic Songs for Modern Worship) – Rob Howard, Scott Harris, Ken BarkerSeasons of Praise – Carol Cymbala (Brooklyn Tabernacle Music)Recorded Music Packaging of the Year
Add to the Beauty – Sara Groves
Life – Andy Hunter°
Mmhmm – Relient K
O God, the Aftermath – Norma JeanRedemption Songs – Jars of ClayThe Boy vs. The Cynic – John Reuben
The Everglow – Mae
The Question – Emery
You Can't Trust a Ladder – The Myriad

Musicals

Musical of the Year
Amazing GraceGrace That Amazes
Redemption: Power of the Cross
Sing Joy
Wondrous Gift

Youth/Children's Musical of the Year
Christmas in Reverse
Christmas Starr
Extreme Christmas
His Renown
King of the Jungle

Videos

Short Form Music Video of the Year
 "Apparitions of Melody" – Kids in the Way
Blake McClure (video director), Tamera Brooks (video producer)
 "Be My Escape" – Relient K
Charles Jensen (video director), Rachel Curl (video producer)
 "Let This One Stay" – Dizmas
Kevin Anderson, Sam Stanton, Steelehouse Productions – Credential Recordings
 "Move" – Thousand Foot Krutch
Brandon Dickerson (video director), Erik Press (video producer)
 "Quien Sabe" – Kyosko
Oscar Frenkel (video director), Kyosko (video producers)
 "Stars" – Switchfoot
Scott Speer (video director), Coleen Haynes (video producer)

Long Form Music Video of the Year
A Night of Stories & Songs – Mark Schultz
Franklin Films (director), Ken Carpenter (producer)
Live at Brooklyn Tabernacle – The Crabb Family
Russell Hall (director), Aaron Crabb, Adam Crabb, Jason Crabb, Kelly Bowling, Brian Hudson, Kim Ryan White (producers)
Live From Another Level – Israel & New Breed
Aaron Lindsey (director), Israel Houghton (producer)
Live Wire – Third Day
Carl Diebold (director), Michael Sacci (producer)
Stacie Orrico Live in Japan – Stacie Orrico
Jim Gable (director), Chris Kraft (producer)

Artists with multiple nominations and awards 

The following artists received multiple nominations:
 Nine: Chris Tomlin
 Six: David Crowder Band, Natalie Grant, Joy Williams, Relient K
 Five: Casting Crowns, The Crabb Family, Jeremy Camp, Switchfoot, BarlowGirl, Third Day, Israel & New Breed
 Three: The Afters, David Crowder Band, Kutless, Mark Hall, Selah
 Two: Ernie Haase & Signature Sound, Mat Kearney, Stellar Kart, David Phelps, Amy Grant, Jars of Clay, Disciple, Thousand Foot Krutch, KJ-52, DJ Maj, 4th Avenue Jones, GRITS, John Reuben, Twila Paris, Bart Millard, Brian Free & Assurance, Yolanda Adams, Mary Mary, Randy Travis, McRaes, The Lewis Family, Buddy Greene, Matt Redman, Kirk Franklin, George Huff, Andy Hunter°

The following artists received multiple awards:
 Four: Chris Tomlin
 Two: Casting Crowns, David Crowder Band, The Crabb Family, Kirk Franklin

References

External links
37th Annual GMA Awards Nominations and Winners on About.com

GMA Music Awards
GMA Dove Awards
2006 in Tennessee
2006 in American music
GMA